Checkered Past is an EP by ska punk band Save Ferris that was released on February 10, 2017, on Withyn Records. The EP marks the band's first release in 18 years since 1999's Modified and their first since lead singer and founding member Monique Powell reformed the band with a brand new lineup after years of legal battles with the former members of the band. The EP was produced by Oingo Boingo bassist John Avila and features a guest appearance by Neville Staple of The Specials on the EP's first single, "New Sound".

Track listing 
All songs written by Monique Powell, except where noted.

 "Anything" – 2:44
 "New Sound" (Powell, Patrick Ferguson) – 3:32
 "Golden Silence" – 3:08
 "Do I Even Like You?" – 2:32
 "Goodbye Brother" – 3:47

Personnel 
 Monique Powell – lead vocals
 Gordon Bash – bass and backing vocals
 Patrick Ferguson – guitar
 Richard Velzen – trombone
 Jonathan Levi Shanes – keyboards
 Brandon Dickert – drums
 Connor McElwain – trumpet
 Alexander Mathias – saxophone
 Joe Berry – additional saxophone

References 

Save Ferris albums
2017 EPs
Ska punk EPs
Columbia Records EPs